Äänekoski is a town in Finland.
is water.

Neighbouring municipalities are Kannonkoski, Konnevesi, Laukaa, Saarijärvi, Uurainen, Vesanto and Viitasaari.

The municipality is unilingually Finnish.

The municipality of Äänekosken maalaiskunta was consolidated to Äänekoski in 1969 and the municipality of Konginkangas in 1993. The municipalities of Sumiainen and Suolahti were consolidated to Äänekoski in 2007.

History 

Äänekoski is named after the nearby rapids. Folk etymology connects the name to the word ääni "sound", but Terho Itkonen has suggested another origin: a Sámi term meaning "big, large" (compare Northern Sámi eanas, "most").

Swedish sources mention a salmon fishery by the rapids around 1455, Ænækoski laxefiskeri. At the time, it was not a proper settlement and was located in the hunting grounds of the people of Sysmä. The Rautalampi parish was established in 1561, at the time it was a large parish covering most of Central Finland north of the Päijänne. The Laukaa parish, including the area of Äänekoski, was separated from Rautalampi in 1628.

A settlement named Äänekoski has existed at least since 1752. It remained a part of Laukaa until the parish was established in 1907 and the municipality Äänekosken maalaiskunta was established in 1911. At the time, Äänekosken maalaiskunta was called simply Äänekoski. The municipality was divided in 1932: the actual settlement of Äänekoski became the kauppala of Äänekoski, Suolahti became another kauppala while the old Äänekoski municipality was renamed Äänekosken maalaiskunta and its administrative seat was moved to the village of Honkola. Äänekoski and Äänekosken maalaiskunta still shared a parish. 

The first industrial enterprises appeared in 1896-1900.

Four municipalities have been consolidated with Äänekoski: Äänekosken maalaiskunta in 1969, Konginkangas in 1993 and Sumiainen and Suolahti in 2007. Äänekoski adopted the coat of arms of Suolahti in 2007.

Nature
There are altogether 170 lakes in Äänekoski. The biggest lakes are Keitele, Kuhnamo and Niinivesi.

One of the world's smallest rivers, the Kuokanjoki, is within the area.

Twin towns – sister cities

The following cities or municipalities are twinned with Äänekoski:

  Örnsköldsvik Municipality, Sweden
  Brande, Brande Municipality, Denmark
  Sigdal, Norway
  Alushta, Alushta municipality, Ukraine
  Borovichi, Novgorod Oblast, Russia (status unknown)
  Sestroretsk, Russia 
  Niamey, Niger

Gallery

See also
 Aura cheese – a blue cheese produced in Äänekoski
 Finnish national road 69

References

External links

Town of Äänekoski – Official website, finnish

 
Cities and towns in Finland
Populated places established in 1911